Adam Baako Nortey Yeboah (born 11 May 1950) is a Ghanaian politician and also a manager. He was a member of the 1st parliament of the 4th republic for the Ablekuma North constituency in the Greater Accra Region of Ghana.

Early life and education 
Yeboah was born on 11 May 1950. He attended International Correspondence Schools where he obtained a certificate as a storekeeper.

Career 
He was a member of the First Parliament of the Fourth Republic of Ghana in 1992 Ghanaian parliamentary election. He was a manager.

Politics 
Yeboah was elected as a member of the 1st Parliament of the 4th Republic of Ghana during the 1992 Ghanaian parliamentary election. He was sworn into office on 7 January 1993 on the ticket of the National Democratic Congress.

In the 1996 elections, Kwamena Bartels won the seat for the New Patriotic Party as a member of the second parliament of the fourth republic of Ghana with a majority votes of 35,747 representing 47.20% of the total valid votes beating his opponents: Denanyoh Ben Mensah of National Democratic Congress 20,214 votes with 26.70% of the share and Nathaniel Addo of NCP 2,559 votes representing 3.40% of the share.

He retained the Ablekuma North constituency seat as a member of parliament during the 2000 Ghanaian general elections .

Personal life 
He is Muslim.

References 

National Democratic Congress (Ghana) politicians
Living people
1950 births
Ghanaian MPs 1993–1997
People from Greater Accra Region
Ghanaian Muslims